Trusley is a civil parish in the South Derbyshire district of Derbyshire, England. The parish contains eight listed buildings that are recorded in the National Heritage List for England.  Of these, one is listed at Grade II*, the middle of the three grades, and the others are at Grade II, the lowest grade.  The parish contains the villages of Trusley and Longlane, and the surrounding countryside.  The listed buildings include houses and cottages, two churches, and a muniment room converted from a summer house.


Key

Buildings

References

Citations

Sources

 

Lists of listed buildings in Derbyshire